Anatoly Nikolayevich Perminov (born 16 June 1945) is a Russian rocket scientist and a mechanical engineer. He served as the General Director of Russian Federal Space Agency in 2004–2011.

Career
Anatoly Perminov graduated in 1967 from a military college with a degree in mechanical engineering, specializing in rocket engines. In 1976, he earned an advanced degree in Moscow from the Military Academy. In 1991 he again earned an advanced degree in Moscow from the Military Academy, after which he was appointed to the head of the Russian Department of Defense research test site. Here he organized the launch of hundreds of satellites and ICBMs. In August 1993 he became the head of operations for missile weapons in the Strategic Missile Forces. He was then the director of Roskosmos from March 2004 to 2011.

Perminov has a PhD in engineering, and has authored more than 70 scientific papers and articles on space exploration. He is a professor of the Moscow Aviation Institute, where he chairs the institute's Operations of Launch Vehicles and Spacecraft department.

On 29 April 2011, Perminov was replaced with Vladimir Popovkin as the director of Roscosmos. The 65-year-old Perminov was over the legal limit for state officials, and had received some criticism after a failed GLONASS launch.

Personal life
Perminov is married. His wife is a teacher and they have a son.

Honours and awards
 Order of Merit for the Fatherland;
3rd class (31 March 2009) - for outstanding contribution to the development of space industry and many years of fruitful activity
4th class (25 September 2004) - for outstanding contribution to the development of the domestic space and strengthening the country's defence
 Order of Military Merit
 Order of the Red Banner of Labour
 Order for Service to the Homeland in the Armed Forces of the USSR, 3rd class
 Honoured Engineer of the Russian Federation
 Gratitude of the President of Russia (2005) - for services in the development of space and many years of honest work
 Order Dostyk, 2nd class (Kazakhstan, 7 December 2004) - for his significant contribution to the development of friendship and cooperation between the peoples of Kazakhstan and Russia
 Officer of the Legion of Honour (France, 2010)
 Laureate of Russian Government for participation in the establishment of the carrier rocket Dnepr

References

1945 births
Living people
1st class Active State Councillors of the Russian Federation
People from Kirov Oblast
Russian mechanical engineers
Russian space program personnel
Recipients of the Order "For Merit to the Fatherland", 3rd class
Recipients of the Order of Military Merit (Russia)
Officiers of the Légion d'honneur
Military Academy of the General Staff of the Armed Forces of the Soviet Union alumni